Álvaro Velasco may refer to:

 Álvaro Velasco (weightlifter) (born 1971), Colombian weightlifter
 Álvaro Velasco (golfer) (born 1981), Spanish professional golfer